Porton Barracks was founded in 1971 as the home of the 51st Battalion, Far North Queensland Regiment.

Porton Barracks was named after the Battle of Porton Plantation. A battle during the Second World War that involved the 31st/51st Battalion, Royal Queensland Regiment.

Current units 

 51st Battalion, Far North Queensland Regiment
 Delta Company, 31st/42nd Battalion, Royal Queensland Regiment
134 ACU (Army Cadet Unit)

References

Barracks in Australia
Military installations in Queensland
Buildings and structures in Cairns